Caldisericum exile is a species of bacteria sufficiently distinct from other bacteria to be placed in its own family, order, class and phylum. It is the first member of the thermophilic candidate phylum OP5 to be cultured and described.

References

External links
Type strain of Caldisericum exile at BacDive -  the Bacterial Diversity Metadatabase

Caldiserica
Thermophiles
Bacteria genera